John Logan Bartholomew (born February 9, 1984) is an American actor born in Galion, Ohio,  best known for his role of Willie LaHaye in 3 of the 8 films in the Love Comes Softly series. He later appeared in series like CSI: Miami (2005) and Close to Home (2007). He also had a small appearance in the thirty-sixth episode of popular TV series Ghost Whisperer, as Ray Peters in the second-season episode, "Speed Demon" (2007). In 2010 he played a troubled hockey player in The Genesis Code. In 2013, he took over the role of Jason Stevens from Drew Fuller, in the sequel to 2007's The Ultimate Gift, The Ultimate Life.

References

External links
 

Living people
American male television actors
1984 births
People from Galion, Ohio
21st-century American male actors